Frank Cotton was an Australian physiologist.

Frank Cotton may also refer to:

Frank Cotton (character)
F. Albert Cotton (Frank Albert Cotton, 1930–2007), chemist

See also
Francis Cotton (disambiguation)